This is a categorized list of notable people who were born or have dwelt in Pune, India. Only people who are sufficiently notable to have individual entries on Wikipedia have been included in the list.

Authors and writers
 Acharya Pralhad Keshav Atre (1898-1969) - Marathi writer, poet and educationist.
 Subhash Awchat (1950-) - artist and author.
 Dr. Sarojini Babar (1920-2008) - prominent folk literater, poetess and writer.
 Malati Bedekar (née Baltai Khare) (1905-2001) - writer in Marathi.
 Ninad Bedekar (1949-2015) - writer, historian and orator.
 Vasudeo Sitaram Bendrey (1894-1986) - Historian who discovered first image of Chhatrapati Shivaji Maharaj, wrote first full-proof biography of Chhatrapati Sambhaji Maharaj and wrote on whole Shivshahi period.
 Vishnushastri Krushnashastri Chiplunkar (1850–1882) – essayist; editor of Nibandha Mala, a Marathi journal; educator; mentor to Bal Gangadhar Tilak and Gopal Ganesh Agarkar; founder of the influential Chitrashala press.
 Purushottam Laxman Deshpande (Pu La Deshpande) (1919-2000) – Marathi author, actor, music composer, singer.
 Muktabai Dixit (1901–1980)  – writer in Marathi.
 Rohit Gore (1977-) - author in Hindi.
 Chintaman Vinayak Joshi (1892–1963) – Marathi humorist and a researcher in Pali literature.
 Dinkar G. Kelkar (1896–1990) - writer, art collector and historian.
 Narasimha Chintaman Kelkar (1872–1947) – writer, journalist, nationalist leader; served on the Viceroy's Executive Council (1924–29).
 Krushnaji Prabhakar Khadilkar (1872–1948) – editor of Kesari and Navakal.
 Vinayak Kulkarni (1950-) – Marathi writer and researcher of literature produced by Marathi saints.
 Shripad Mahadev Mate (1886–1957) – writer and teacher.
 Shaiju Mathew (1980-) - author, film maker.
 Shirish Pai (1929-2017) – writer in Marathi and English.
 Shanta Shelke (1922–2002) – Marathi poet.
 Mangesh Tendulkar (1934-2017) – cartoonist.

Artists and entertainers

Movie, television and theater personalities
Bharati Achrekar (1957-) - actress and singer.
Mohan Agashe (1947-) -  theater/film actor and Sangeet Natak Akademi awardee.
Radhika Apte (1985-) - film and stage actress.
Sanskruti Balgude (1992-) - actress who appears in Marathi movies and television.
Mukta Barve (1979-) - film, television and theater actress, and producer.
Pooja Chopra (1986-) – Femina Miss India, 2009.
Annalisa Cochrane (1996–) – actress
Kashmira Irani (1986-) - television and theatre actress.
Shivangi Joshi (1998-) - television actress and model.
Shivangi Khedkar (1995-) - television actress and model.
Dipika Kakar (1986-) – actress.
Gauahar Khan (1983-) - model and actress.
Chandrakant Kulkarni (1963-) - director, script writer and actor associated with Marathi theatre and film.
Mrunal Kulkarni née Dev/Deo (1971-) – actress.
Roopesh Kumar (1946–1995) – film actor.
Reema Lagoo (1958–2017) – stage and film actress; alumna of  Huzurpaga high school.
Shriram Lagoo (1927–2019) – film and stage actor.
Prajakta Mali (1989-) - television/film/theatre actor, anchor, producer and  Bharatnatyam dancer.
Spike Milligan (1919–2000) – Irish comedian who spent his childhood in the city.
Anjali Mukhi (1986-) - television and theatre actress.
Sai Paranjpye (1938-) – broadcaster and film director.
Nilkanth Krishnaji Phule (Nilu Phule) (1931–2009) – film and theatre actor.
Sharad Talwalkar (1918–2001) – film, TV and theatre comedy actor.

Musicians and dancers
Sanjeev Abhyankar (1969-) – Hindustani classical music vocalist of the Mewati Gharana.
Mandar Agashe (1969-) – music director.
Vineet Alurkar (1949-) – musician and singer-songwriter.
Prabha Atre (1932-) – Hindustani classical music vocalist of the Kirana gharana and a  Padma Shri awardee.
Neela Bhagwat (1942-) – Hindustani classical music musician of the Gwalior Gharana.
Vishnu Narayan Bhatkhande (1860–1936) – eminent maestro of Hindustani classical music; alumnus of Deccan College.
Bhaskar Chandavarkar (1936-2009) – musician.
Rahul Deshpande (1979-) -  Hindustani classical music vocalist; grandson of Pandit Dr. Vasantrao Deshpande.
Ajay Gogawale (1976-) – one half of the music director-composer sibling duo Ajay–Atul.
Atul Gogawale (1974-) – one half of the music director-composer sibling duo Ajay–Atul.
Pandit Bhimsen Joshi (1922–2011) – Hindustani classical vocalist and recipient of the Bharat Ratna.
Ritviz (1996–) – singer-songwriter, electronic musician, and record producer.

Defence services personnel
General Manoj Mukund Naravane, PVSM, AVSM, SM, VSM, ADC (1960-) -  retired Army General who served as the 27th Chief of the Army Staff (COAS), as well as the temporary  Chairman of the Chiefs of Staff Committee (Chairman COSC) from 15 December 2021 until his superannuation on 30 April 2022. He is an alumnus of the Jnana Prabodhini Prashala and the  National Defence Academy (NDA).

Educationalists and researchers
 Shivrampant Damle (1900–1977) - educationalist.
 Sonopant (Shankar Vaman) Dandekar (1896–1969) – philosopher and educationalist.
 Rohini Godbole (1952-) – particle physicist.
 Jyoti Gogte (1956-) - academician.
 P. A. Inamdar (1945-) – educationalist.
 B. K. S. Iyengar (1918–2014) – yoga teacher; developed internationally popular Iyengar Yoga.
 Anandibai Joshi (1865–1887) – first Indian and Hindu woman to get a medical degree from a foreign university.
 Narendra Karmarkar (1957-) – mathematician and creator of Karmarkar's algorithm.
 Irawati Karve (1905–1970) – anthropologist.
 Raghunath Mashelkar (1943-) – chemical engineer, scientist.
 Tarabai Modak (1892–1973) – advocate of  Montessori education; recipient of the Padmabhushan.
 Jayant Narlikar (1938-) - astrophysicist.
 Satish Pande – radiologist, conservationist and wildlife researcher
 Datto Vaman Potdar (1890–1979) – historian.
 Vishwanath Kashinath Rajwade (1863–1926) – historian; founder of Pune-based Bharat Itihas Sanshodhak Mandal.
 Kamal Ranadive (1917–2001) – biologist specialising in cancer research.
 Pandurang Vasudeo Sukhatme (1911–1997) – statistician, recipient of the Padmabhushan.

Engineers and architects
 Prof. Christopher Charles Benninger (1942-) - born in the US and settled in Pune in 1976, he is one of India's highly decorated architects; his award-winning projects include The  Mahindra United World College of India, The Samundra Institute of Maritime Studies, The  Suzlon One Earth world headquarters, The National Ceremonial Plaza at Thimphu, Bhutan and India House (his residence and design studio at Balewadi, Pune). He co-founded the  Center for Development Studies and Activities (CDSA) along with his wife Aneeta Gokhale – Benninger in Pune in 1976.

Industrialists and business leaders

Industrialists
 Anu Aga (1942-) - businesswoman and social worker.
 Chandrashekhar Agashe (1888–1956) - founder of Brihan Maharashtra Sugar Syndicate.
 Rahul Bajaj (1938-2022) – industrialist.
 Rajiv Bajaj (1966-) - businessman and managing director of Bajaj Auto.
 Ajaypal Singh Banga (1960-) – USA-based corporate executive and political advisor to former US President Barack Obama and Padma Shri awardee.
 Anant Gadgil (Dajikaka Gadgil) (1915–2014) - founder of P. N. Gadgil Jewellers.
 Babashaeb Neelkanth Kalyani (Baba Kalyani) (1949-) – industrialist.
 Laxmanrao Kashinath Kirloskar (1869–1956) – founder of Kirloskar Group.
 Shantanurao Laxmanrao Kirloskar (1903–1994) – industrialist.
 Ivan Menezes (1959-) – business executive, CEO of Diageo; brother of Victor Menezes.
 Victor Menezes (1947-) - banker, former chairman and CEO of Citibank; brother of Ivan Menezes.
 Adar C. Poonawalla (1981-) - businessman, CEO of the Serum Institute of India; son of Cyrus S. Poonawalla.
 Cyrus S. Poonawalla (1945-) - businessman, chairman of Poonawalla Group, which includes the Serum Institute of India; father of Adar Poonawalla.

Business leaders
 Shashishekhar Balkrishna Pandit (Ravi Pandit) (1950-) - chairman and group CEO of KPIT Technologies; founder trustee of Janwani (an NGO focused on improvements in urban India) and the Pune International Centre. He has been honored with the Maharashtra Corporate Excellence (MAXELL) Awards for "Excellence in Entrepreneurship" and for his contribution to the economic and industrial development of  Pune City, and the prestigious Samata Award.
 Natasha Poonawalla (1981-) - businesswoman, chairwoman of the Villoo Poonawalla Foundation.
 Pankaj Sharma(?-) - president of The Lexicon Group and Pune Mirror.
 Laxman Narasimhan - CEO of Starbucks from October 2022. Former Chief Commercial Officer of PepsiCo and Former CEO of Reckitt

Political figures

Personages during the Maratha empire
 Peshwa Bajirao-  a minister in the court of Shahu of Satara, responsible for shifting the administrative capital to Pune
 Jijabai (1598-1674) – wife of Shahajiraje Bhosale Jagirdar of Pune, Shahajiraje; mother of Chhatrapati Shivaji Maharaj who raised him during 1640s in Pune.

Freedom fighters
 Gopal Ganesh Agarkar (1856–1895) – journalist, educator and social reformer
 Senapati Bapat (born Pandurang Mahadev Bapat) (1880-1967) - a figure in the Indian independence movement.
 Gopal Krishna Gokhale (1866–1915) – early Nationalist leader on the moderate wing of the Congress party; founder of the Servants of India Society
 Lokhitwadi (Gopal Hari Deshmukh) (1823-1892) – social reformer
 Mahatma Jyotiba Phule-Prominent leader of modern India responsible for women's educational rights and eradicating caste discrimination
 Bal Gangadhar Tilak (1856–1920) -  Indian nationalist leader

Politicians post-independence
 Vitthalrao Gadgil – Leader of Indian National Congress
 Anil Shirole - Ex-Member of Parliament from Pune, Former Big Leader of Pune and BJP.
 Siddharth Shirole - Present Member of Legislative Assembly from Shivajinagar Assembly Constituency Pune, Present Leader of Shivajinagar, Pune and BJP.
 Bal Thackeray (1926-2012) – founder of the Shiv Sena; born in Pune.

Social reformers
 R. G. Bhandarkar (1837–1925) – Orientalist and social reformer
 Mahatma Jyotiba Phule (1827–1890)– Social reformer, prominently known for modern educational ideas & eradicating caste discrimination
 Pandita Ramabai Dongre (1858–1922) – social reformer
 Mahadev Govind Ranade (1842–1901) – judge and social reformer
 Savitribai Phule (1831–1897) – Social reformer & responsible for women's educational rights after a great revolt against society

Spiritual leaders
 Meher Baba (1894–1969) – spiritual leader
 Aga Khan II (1830-1885) - Imam of the Ismailis
 Jangali Maharaj (1804-1890) Great Sadhguru.
 Rajneesh (Osho) (1931-1990)

Sportspersons
 Pankaj Advani (born 1985) – billiards and snooker world champion
 Ashutosh Agashe (born 1972) - cricket player and businessman.
 Dnyaneshwar Agashe (1942–2009) – cricketer and cricket administrator
 Chinmay Gupte (born 1972) – former cricketer
 Eban Hyams (born 1981) – Indian-born Australian professional basketball player
 Kedar Jadhav (born 1985) - cricketer who plays for India in international cricket.
 Hrishikesh Kanitkar (born 1974) – former cricketer
 Nikhil Kanetkar (born 1979) – badminton player and Olympian
 Shubhangi Kulkarni (born 1959) - cricketer 
 Dhanraj Pillay (born 1968) – hockey player
 Maninder Singh (born 1965) – cricketer
 Lisa Sthalekar (born 1979) – former Indian-born Australian international cricketer

See also
 Pune

References

Pune
People from Pune
People from Pune district